Hendin is a surname. Notable people with the surname include:

Clara Hendin, British socialist activist
David Hendin (born 1945), American medical journalist and numismatist
Josephine Gattuso Hendin (born 1944), American writer and critic
Marty Hendin (1948–2008), American baseball executive